Homosexualités et Socialisme (HES) is a politically independent LGBT organization affiliated with the Parti Socialiste in France officially, since 2015, and with the Parti Radical de Gauche since 2019. It was created in 1983 by Jan-Paul Pouliquen. From 1993 to 1997, its president was Stéphane Martinet. Its former president from 2007 to 2012 was Gilles Bon-Maury. It is a member of ILGA-Europe and was a member of Rainbow Rose.

See also
GayLib – a moderate conservative equivalent

References

External links
Official website

LGBT socialism
LGBT political advocacy groups in France
1983 establishments in France
LGBT affiliate organizations of political parties
Socialist Party (France)